William Andrew Walls (29 December 1859 – 19 February 1936) was a Scotland international rugby union player. He became the 38th President of the Scottish Rugby Union.

Rugby Union career

Amateur career

He played as a forward for Glasgow Academicals.

Provincial career

He represented Glasgow District against Edinburgh District in the world's first provincial match, the 'inter-city', on 23 November 1872.

He also represented Glasgow District against Edinburgh District in the 3 December 1881 match. This was Glasgow District's first win over Edinburgh District in the inter-city matches.

International career

Walls represented Scotland in the 1881–82 Home Nations rugby union matches and in the 1883 Home Nations Championship and subsequent Home Nations Championship till 1886.

Administrative career

He became the 38th President of the Scottish Rugby Union. He served one year from 1911 to 1912.

References

1859 births
1936 deaths
Scottish rugby union players
Scotland international rugby union players
Rugby union forwards
Glasgow District (rugby union) players
Glasgow Academicals rugby union players
Presidents of the Scottish Rugby Union
Rugby union players from Glasgow